The 2012–13 Villanova Wildcats men's basketball team  represented Villanova University in the 2012–13 NCAA Division I men's basketball season. Villanova was led by head coach Jay Wright, who was in his 12th season. The Wildcats participated in the Big East Conference and played their home games at The Pavilion with some select home games at the Wells Fargo Center. They finished the season 20–14, 10–8 in Big East play to finish in a tie for seventh place. They lost in the quarterfinals of the Big East tournament to Louisville. They received an at large bid to the 2013 NCAA tournament where they lost in the second round to North Carolina.

This was Villanova's final season as a member of the original Big East Conference. The so-called Catholic 7 schools joined together with Butler, Creighton and Xavier to form a new conference that kept the Big East Conference name, but as an entirely new conference.

Roster

Schedule

|-
!colspan=9| Exhibition

|-
!colspan=9| Regular season

|-
!colspan=9| 2013 Big East men's basketball tournament

|-
!colspan=9| 2013 NCAA tournament

References

Villanova Wildcats
Villanova Wildcats men's basketball seasons
Villanova Wildcats